USA Powerlifting (USAPL) is a national powerlifting organization in the United States The USAPL sanctions local, regional and national meets in the country. The current president of the USAPL is Larry Maile.

The USAPL is a drug tested organization and restricts the usage of equipment to single ply suits and shirts in the equipped division. The raw division of the USAPL allows wrist wraps and knee sleeves as well as a weight belt. In 2019 it announced that trans-women would not be allowed to compete as women.

In November 2021, USA Powerlifitng was expelled from the International Powerlifting Federation over some of its policies.  On January 14, 2021, female transgender weightlifter JayCee Cooper launched a discrimination lawsuit against USA Powerlifting in the District Court of Minnesota. In place of IPF World Championships, USA Powerlifting has started the USA Powerlifting Pro Series Circuit. In March 2023, a Minnesota Court ruled that USA Powerlifting must permit transgender athletes to compete.

Age Divisions

Women & Men
Source:
OPEN: From the day she/he reaches 14 years and upwards (no category restrictions need apply).
YOUTH: 
1. From the day she/he reaches 8 years to the day before he reaches 10 years. 
2. From the day she/he reaches 10 years to the day before he reaches 12 years. 
3. From the day she/he reaches 12 years to the day before he reaches 14 years. 
TEEN: 
1. From the day she/he reaches 14 years to the day before he reaches 16 years. 
2. From the day she/he reaches 16 years to the day before he reaches 18 years. 
3. From the day she/he reaches 18 years to the day before he reaches 20 years. 
JUNIOR: From the day she/he reaches 20 years to the day before he reaches 24 years.
MASTERS: 
1A. From 1 January in the calendar year she/he reaches 40 years and throughout the full calendar year in which she/he reaches 44 years.
1B. From 1 January in the calendar year she/he reaches 45 years and throughout the full calendar year in which she/he reaches 49 years. 
2A. From 1 January in the calendar year she/he reaches 50 years and throughout the full calendar year in which she/he reaches 54 years. 
2B. From 1 January in the calendar year she/he reaches 55 years and throughout the full calendar year in which she/he reaches 59 years. 
3A. From 1 January in the calendar year she/he reaches 60 years and throughout the full calendar year in which she/he reaches 64 years. 
3B. From 1 January in the calendar year she/he reaches 65 years and throughout the full calendar year in which she/he reaches 69 years. 
4A. From 1 January in the calendar year she/he reaches 70 years and throughout the full calendar year in which she/he reaches 74 years. 
4B. From 1 January in the calendar year she/he reaches 75 years and throughout the full calendar year in which she/he reaches 79 years.

USAPL Open National Championships
===Men's Open===

Women's Open

Raw Powerlifting National Championships 
The USAPL Raw Powerlifting National Championships have been contested since 2008. The Championships are broken up into the standard weight classes and age divisions (Teens, Juniors, Open, Masters). The Championships started out with around 150 lifters, but have now grown to over 1,000.

Teen National Champions

Junior National Champions

Open National Champions

Masters National Champions

See also
International Powerlifting Federation
International World Games Association
SportAccord

References

External links
Official USAPL website

Powerlifting
Sports governing bodies in the United States